The Church of Greenland (literally: "The Congregation"), consisting of the Diocese of Greenland is the official Lutheran church in Greenland under the leadership of the Bishop of Greenland. Paneeraq Siegstad Munk became Bishop in 2020. 

The Church of Greenland is semi-independent from the Church of Denmark, but is still considered a diocese of the Church of Denmark.

History
Historically (before the Reformation) the Diocese of Greenland was known as the Diocese of Garðar. This ancient diocese fell into disuse in the 14th century with the death of Bishop Álfur in 1378. 

Nonetheless, bishops were still appointed up until 1537, though none of these ever made it to Greenland. From 1905 to 1923 Greenland was part of the now defunct Diocese of Zealand. From 1923 to 1993 it was part of the Diocese of Copenhagen. 

In 1980 a bishop was appointed for Greenland on behalf of the Bishop of Copenhagen. The Diocese was only re-established in 1993 when it was renamed as the Diocese of Greenland, independent from the Diocese of Copenhagen.

Independent status
The Church of Greenland, in common with other institutions within the territory, is governed from Denmark, but with a large measure of autonomy. The Church of Greenland consists of a single diocese, which is part of the Danish church, but is moving towards full independence. In this respect it is following the example of the Church of the Faroe Islands, which is also a single diocese, and achieved full independence from the Church of Denmark in July 2007. 

On June 21, 2009, the Church of Greenland was taken over by the local government of Greenland, where both funding and legislation now falls under the government of Greenland as opposed to other dioceses in the Church of Denmark who fall under the authority of the Danish parliament. 

Nonetheless, the Church of Greenland is still a diocese of the Church of Denmark.

Church structure
In common with other evangelical episcopal Lutheran churches, the Church of Greenland recognises the historic three-fold ministry of bishops, priests, and deacons; it acknowledges the two dominical sacraments of baptism and the eucharist; it provides liturgies for other rites including confirmation, marriage, ordination, confession, and burial; its faith is based on scripture, the ancient creeds of the Church, and the Augsburg Confession.

It is in full communion with the other Lutheran churches of the Nordic and Baltic states, and with the Anglican churches of the British Isles.

The clergy, who work with local parish councils, but are ordained and supervised by the bishop, work in a network of seventeen parishes, with churches and chapels across Greenland. 

Four senior priests hold the title of 'Dean' - one as Dean of the cathedral church, and three as Area Deans for the three deaneries, an administrative structure between the level of the diocese and that of the local parishes.

See also
Religion in Greenland
Bishop of Greenland

References

Further reading

External links
 http://www.ilagiit.gl

Greenland
Lutheranism in Greenland
Lutheran World Federation members
National churches
Members of the World Council of Churches
Church of Denmark